CHMM-FM is a community radio station that operates at 103.5 FM in Mackenzie, British Columbia, Canada.

Owned by Mackenzie and Area Radio Society, the station received CRTC approval in 2003.

References

External links
CHMM

HMM
HMM
Radio stations established in 2003
2003 establishments in British Columbia